Synergy Health plc was a global company headquartered in the United Kingdom. The company provides specialist outsourced services to the healthcare and related markets around the world, including sterilization services for medical device and other manufacturers, decontamination of surgical instruments for hospitals and other medical practitioners together with related hygiene services. The company was listed on the London Stock Exchange until it was acquired by Steris Corporation in October 2015.

History
Synergy was founded in 1991 as a manufacturer of surgical packs in Corby, Northamptonshire, listing on the Alternative Investment Market in London that same year. In subsequent years the company grew organically and through acquisition, buying a number of healthcare-related companies including Shiloh, and Vernon Carus in the United Kingdom; Isotron Plc which extended the company's footprint in Europe and Asia, and MSI and SRI which acted as a springboard into the United States.

In October 2014, medical technology provider Steris Corporation agreed to buy Synergy for £1.2 billion ($1.9 billion). The new Steris Corporation will be based in the UK for tax purposes (35 percent in US and only 25 percent in UK), while the US business will still operate.

Operations
The company's services include the medical device sterilisation, sterilisation of reusable medical instruments, provision of outsourced laundry services and the reprocessing of surgical linen. Synergy also provides a range of laboratory services including occupational pathology services and workplace drug and alcohol testing. The company also distributes medical hygiene products such as proprietary antibacterial cleansers and wet wipes, swabs and bandages. The company operates in four regions: UK & Ireland, Europe & Middle East, Asia & Africa and the Americas.

References

External links
 

Companies based in Swindon
Health care companies established in 1991
Companies listed on the London Stock Exchange
Health care companies of the United Kingdom
1991 establishments in England